The following television stations broadcast on digital or analog channel 4 in Canada:

 CFJC-TV in Kamloops, British Columbia
 CFRN-TV-9 in Slave Lake, Alberta
 CFTF-DT-4 in Forestville, Quebec
 CHAU-DT-7 in Rivière-au-Renard, Quebec
 CHEX-TV-1 in Bancroft, Ontario
 CHFD-DT in Thunder Bay, Ontario
 CIMT-DT-1 in Edmundston, New Brunswick
 CITL-DT in Lloydminster, Alberta/Saskatchewan
 CITO-TV-3 in Hearst, Ontario
 CJCB-TV in Sydney, Nova Scotia
 CKEM-TV-1 in Red Deer, Alberta
 CKYB-TV in Brandon, Manitoba

04 TV stations in Canada